TPHS may refer to:
 Transactions of the Philological Society (TPhS), a linguistics journal
 Terrace Park High School, Terrace Park, Ohio, United States
 Terry Parker High School, Jacksonville, Florida, United States
 Tinley Park High School, Tinley Park, Illinois, United States
 Torrey Pines High School, San Diego, California, United States